Swinging Bridge is a popular destination in Yosemite Valley, California, United States, for swimming, with an excellent view of Yosemite Falls. The land in the area resembles that of a beach. Although official policy does not allow visitors to jump off the bridge, this is sometimes disregarded.

The area northeast of the bridge is available for weddings of 20 people or less. No ceremonies are allowed on the bridge.

References

Buildings and structures in Yosemite National Park
Bridges in Mariposa County, California